The 2004 CIS football season began on September 2, 2004, and concluded with the 40th Vanier Cup national championship on November 27 at Ivor Wynne Stadium in Hamilton, Ontario, with the Laval Rouge et Or winning their third championship and second consecutive. Twenty-seven universities across Canada competed in CIS football this season, the highest level of amateur play in Canadian football, under the auspices of Canadian Interuniversity Sport (CIS).

Awards and records

Awards 
 Hec Crighton Trophy – Jesse Lumsden, McMaster
 Presidents' Trophy – Mickey Donovan, Concordia
 Russ Jackson Award – Nathan Beveridge, UBC 
 J. P. Metras Trophy – Troy Cunningham, Concordia
 Peter Gorman Trophy – Kyle Williams, Bishop's

All-Canadian team 
First Team
Offence
Steve Bilan, QB, Saskatchewan
Jesse Lumsden, RB, McMaster
Andre Durie, RB, York 
Andrew Fantuz, WR, Western 
Andrew Ginther, WR, Alberta 
Arjei Franklin, IR, Windsor 
Nathan Beveridge, IR, UBC 
Dominic Picard, C, Laval 
Ben Walsh, G, McGill 
Fabio Filice, G, McMaster 
Pierre Tremblay, T, Laval 
Richard Yalowsky, T, Calgary 
Defence
Troy Cunningham, DE, Concordia 
Kyle Markin, DE, Acadia 
Nick Johansson, DT, UBC
Marc-André Dion, DT, Laval 
David Lowry, LB, Alberta 
Jason Pottinger, LB, McMaster 
Mickey Donovan, LB, Concordia 
Gregory Lavaud, CB, Montréal 
Eric Nielsen, CB, Acadia 
Derek Baldry, HB, Alberta
Ian Logan, HB, Laurier 
Jason Milne, FS, Alberta 
Special Teams
Mike Renaud, P, Concordia 
Rob Pikula, K, Western 
Second Team 
Offense
Ryan Pyear, QB, Laurier 
Jarred Winkel, RB, Alberta
Jeronimo Huerta Flores, RB, Laval
Kenneth Branco, WR, Ottawa
Ivan Birungi, WR, Acadia
Michael Black, IR, Acadia
Iain Fleming, IR, Queen's
Evan Haney, C, Calgary
Geoff St. Denis, G, Western
Adam Krajewski, G, Simon Fraser
Ryan Jeffrey, T, Laurier 
Chris Sutherland, T, Saskatchewan
Defence
Ricky Foley, DE, York 
Jeff Robertshaw, DE, McMaster 
Ryan Gottselig, DT, Saskatchewan
Andrew Jones, DT, McMaster
Marc Trépanier, LB, Montréal 
Jesse Alexander, LB, Laurier
Matt Harding, LB, Mount Allison 
Conor Healey, CB, Laurier 
Ryan Barnstable, CB, Saskatchewan 
Dustin Cherniawski, HB, UBC
Sebastian Clovis, HB, Saint Mary's
John Sullivan, FS, Waterloo 
Special Teams
Rob Pikula, P, Western 
No nomination, K

Results

Regular season standings 
Note: GP = Games Played, W = Wins, L = Losses, OTL = Overtime Losses, PF = Points For, PA = Points Against, Pts = Points

''Teams in bold have earned playoff berths.

Top 10

NR = Not Ranked.

Championships 
The Vanier Cup is played between the champions of the Mitchell Bowl and the Uteck Bowl, the national semi-final games. In 2005, according to the rotating schedule, the winners of the Canada West conference Hardy Trophy met the winners of the Atlantic conference Loney Bowl championship for the Mitchell Bowl. The Ontario conference's Yates Cup championship team travelled to the Dunsmore Cup Quebec champion for the Uteck Bowl.

Vanier Cup

Notes 

U Sports football seasons
CIS football season